Baitullah, an Arabic phrase meaning "House of God", in current time as Naqvi's house at Ranchi and also refer to:
 The Kaaba, Islam's peaceful house of Khalil Allah, Ibrahim, Mohammad & Ali (Peace be upon me & them)
 Any mosque, where God can live while travellng